The Reference Sequence (RefSeq) database is an open access, annotated and curated collection of publicly available nucleotide sequences (DNA, RNA) and their protein products. RefSeq was first introduced in 2000. This database is built by National Center for Biotechnology Information (NCBI), and, unlike GenBank, provides only a single record for each natural biological molecule (i.e. DNA, RNA or protein) for major organisms ranging from viruses to bacteria to eukaryotes.

For each model organism, RefSeq aims to provide separate and linked records for the genomic DNA, the gene transcripts, and the proteins arising from those transcripts. RefSeq is limited to major organisms for which sufficient data are available (121,461 distinct "named" organisms as of July 2022), while GenBank includes sequences for any organism submitted (approximately 504,000 formally described species).

RefSeq categories 
RefSeq collection comprises different data types, with different origins, so it is necessary to establish standard categories and identifiers to store each data type. The most important categories are:

For more details and more categories, see Table 1 in Chapter 18 of the book The Reference Sequence (RefSeq) Database.

RefSeq Projects 
Several projects to improve RefSeq services are currently in development by the NCBI, often in collaboration with research centers such as EMBL-EBI:

 Consensus CDS (CCDS): This project aims to identify a core set of human and mouse protein-coding regions and standardize sets of genes with high and consistent levels of genomic annotation quality. This project was announced in 2009 and is still in development.

 RefSeq Functional Elements (RefSeqFE): It is focused on describing non-genic functional elements which are gene regulatory regions such as: enhancers, silencers, DNase I hypersensitive regions, DNA replication origins etc.). The current scope of this project is restricted to the human and mouse genomes.
 RefSeqGene: Its main goal is to define genomic sequences to be used as reference standards for well-characterized genes. Previously described mRNA, protein and chromosome sequences have the weaknesses of not providing explicit genomic coordinates of gene flanking and intronic regions as well as showing awkwardly large coordinates that change with every new genome assembly. The RefSeqGene project is designed to eliminate these errors.
 Targeted Loci: This project records molecular markers, specially protein-coding and ribosomal RNA loci that are used for phylogenetic and barcoding analysis. The scope of this project includes sequences for Archaea, Bacteria and Fungi organisms, accessible via Entrez and BLAST queries. It also includes GenBank sequences for Animals, Plants and Protists, accessible via BLAST queries.
 Virus Variation (ViV): It is a specific resource of sequence data processing pipelines and analysis tools for display and retrieval of sequences from several viral groups such as influenza virus, ebolavirus, MERS coronavirus or Zika virus. New viruses, processing pipelines, tools and other features are included regularly.
 RefSeq Select: This project aims to select datasets of RefSeq Select transcripts, as the most representative for every protein-coding gene, based on multiple criteria: prior use in clinical databases, transcript expression, evolutionary conservation of the coding region etc. Since many genes are represented by multiple RefSeq transcripts/proteins due to the biological process of alternative splicing, this complexity is problematic for studies such as comparative genomics or exchange of clinical variant data.
 MANE (Matched Annotation from the NCBI and EMBL-EBI): It is a collaborative project between NCBI and EMBL-EBI whose main goal is to define a set of transcripts and their proteins for all the protein-coding genes in the human genome. By doing that, the differences in transcripts annotation between RefSeq and Ensembl/GENCODE annotation systems are reduced. A MANE Select transcripts set are created as a useful universal standard for clinical reporting and comparative or evolutionary genomics. A second MANE Plus Clinical set are also created with additional transcripts to report all Pathogenic (P) or Likely Pathogenic (LP) clinical variants available in public resources. This project was announced in 2018 and is expected to finish in 2022.

Statistics 
According to the RefSeq release 213 (July 2022), the number of species represented in the database by counting distinct taxonomic IDs are as follows:

The counts of accession and basepairs per molecule type are:

See also 
 GenBank
 Sequence analysis
 Sequence profiling tool
 Sequence motif
 UniProt
 List of sequenced eukaryotic genomes
 List of sequenced archaeal genomes

References

Sources

External links 
 RefSeq
 GenBank, RefSeq, TPA and UniProt: What's in a Name?

Genetics databases
National Institutes of Health